"Treehouse of Horror III" is the fifth episode of the fourth season of the American animated television series The Simpsons. It originally aired on the Fox network in the United States on October 29, 1992. The third annual Treehouse of Horror episode, it features segments in which Homer buys Bart an evil talking Krusty doll, King Homer is captured by Mr. Burns, and Bart and Lisa inadvertently cause zombies to attack Springfield.

The episode was written by Al Jean, Mike Reiss, Jay Kogen, Wallace Wolodarsky, Sam Simon, and Jon Vitti, and directed by Carlos Baeza.

Plot
Homer appears in front of a curtain and warns viewers that the following episode is scary. He then tells parents to turn off their television and calls them chicken, causing the screen to go black and Marge to chastise Homer for insulting the show's audience. The episode's wraparound segment shows the Simpson family having a Halloween party for the children of Springfield. Lisa, Grampa and Bart each tell a horror story.

Clown Without Pity
In a parody of The Twilight Zone episode "Living Doll", Trilogy of Terror, Gremlins and the Child's Play franchise, Homer realizes that he forgot to buy Bart a present for his birthday. He rushes to the House of Evil, where he purchases a talking Krusty the Clown doll. The shopkeeper warns him that the doll is cursed, but Homer dismisses his concerns. He returns to the party and gives Bart the doll. Grampa exclaims that the doll is evil, but admits that he is just trying to get attention.

Later, Homer plays with the doll when it starts saying that it is going to kill him. He dismisses this until the doll tries to stab him. After numerous attempts on Homer's life, he captures the doll, locks it in a suitcase, and drops it in a "Bottomless Pit". Returning home, Homer is ambushed by the escaped doll, who tackles him into the kitchen and tries to drown him in Santa's Little Helper's dog bowl. Marge calls the consumer service hotline. A repairman arrives and discovers that the doll has been set to "Evil" mode. He flips the switch to "Good" and the Krusty doll becomes friends with Homer, although it is quickly put to work as Homer's slave. The Krusty doll returns to its girlfriend (a Malibu Stacy doll) in Lisa's dollhouse.

King Homer
Grampa takes over in telling a story in a parody of the 1933 King Kong film, Marge joins Mr. Burns (as a parody of Carl Denham) and Smithers (as a parody of Jack Driscoll) on an expedition to Ape Island to find the legendary King Homer. After landing on the island, Mr. Burns, Smithers, and Marge stealthily approach a native tribe, but when they are spotted due to Marge's hair protruding over the bushes, she is kidnapped and tied to a post as an offering for King Homer, who is summoned by the sound of drums. Marge is initially terrified but sees the friendly side of Homer when he is attracted to Marge's perfume, and the two form a friendship. Nonetheless, Mr. Burns is determined to capture King Homer and Smithers knocks Homer unconscious with a gas bomb.

Returning to New York, the group display King Homer at a Broadway theatre. The photographers' flashes enrage King Homer, who breaks free from his restraints. He abducts Marge and attempts to climb the Empire State Building, but is unable to get past the second story of the building and collapses in exhaustion. In the end, King Homer and Marge get married.

Dial "Z" for Zombies
In a parody of Return of the Living Dead, Bart finds a book of black magic in Springfield Elementary Library when he is asked to write a book report for class. That night, when Lisa reminisces about the family's dead cat, Snowball I, Bart suggests that he could use a spell from the book to resurrect Snowball. At the Springfield pet cemetery with Lisa, Bart utters an incantation, but accidentally reanimates corpses from the nearby human cemetery instead. The zombies terrorize Springfield, turning many people into zombies.

Meanwhile, the Simpson family has barricaded all the doors and windows except for the back door, which Homer forgot to do. Several zombies break into the house: Homer sacrifices himself to give the others time to escape, but the zombies leave him when they realize he does not have enough brains for them to eat. Lisa realizes that the school library must have a book that can reverse the spell. The Simpsons arrive at the Springfield Elementary Library and Bart casts the appropriate counter-spell, causing all zombies to return to their graves.

Production
This episode originally encountered trouble when the color version came back from South Korea. With only six weeks to the airdate, the writers made almost one hundred line changes, a very rare occurrence. It was decided to completely overhaul the episode after a poorly received screening with the writing staff.

The tombstones that appeared at the start of and during the episode were abandoned in later episodes because it was becoming increasingly difficult to think of ideas. A subtle tombstone joke in this episode is in the scene where two zombies are crawling out of their graves. The names Jay Kogen and Wolodarsky (two of The Simpsons writers who worked on the episode) are written on the tombstones, but both are misspelled.

The "King Homer" segment is one of Matt Groening's all-time favorite stories from the Treehouse of Horror series. Al Jean was also quite worried about this segment because it was the longest running black-and-white segment they had ever aired, and he thought that some people might be concerned that their televisions were broken. The "He was a zombie?" line, created by Mike Reiss, is, in the opinions of the writers, one of the all-time classic lines from the series.

Cultural references

The opening sequence where Homer walks into Alfred Hitchcock's silhouette is a parody of Alfred Hitchcock Presents. It was meant to show Homer's stomach bigger than that of the outline, but it was so subtle that not many people realized the joke. In the episode's wraparounds, Bart is dressed as Alex from the film A Clockwork Orange. The "Clown Without Pity" segment is based on the Twilight Zone episode "Living Doll" and the film Trilogy of Terror. The title itself is a play on the song "Town Without Pity", written for the movie of the same name and performed by Gene Pitney.

The man that gives Homer the Krusty doll is based on Mr. Wing from the film Gremlins. The song Homer sings in the bathtub is a variation of the Oscar Meyer song with the letters spelling out his name instead of "O-S-C-A-R".  The Krusty doll riding under Homer's car is a reference to the 1991 film Cape Fear. 
The song Marge hears while put on hold after calling the Krusty doll hotline is "Everybody Loves a Clown" by Gary Lewis & the Playboys.

The "King Homer" segment is a parody of the 1933 film King Kong. In "King Homer", the tribal leader is heard saying 'Mosi Tatupu, Mosi Tatupu', which means they will sacrifice the blue-haired lady. During King Homer's rampage, he spots Shirley Temple singing On the Good Ship Lollipop and ends up grabbing and devouring her.

The title "Dial "Z" for Zombies" is a play on the title of the 1954 Hitchcock film Dial M for Murder. "Dial "Z" for Zombies" references Return of the Living Dead, Night of the Living Dead and Pet Sematary. In the pet cemetery, there are tombstones that read Fish Police, Capitol Critters and Family Dog, each a short-lived animated series intended to capitalize on The Simpsons success.

When raising the dead from their graves, Bart wears Michael Jackson's record album cover Thriller on his head. This is a reference to Jackson's famous music video, in which he dances with zombies.

Reception
In its original broadcast, "Treehouse of Horror III" finished 20th in ratings for the week of October 26 – November 1, 1992, with a Nielsen rating of 14.7, equivalent to approximately 13.7 million viewing households. It was the highest-rated show on the Fox network that week, beating In Living Color. Warren Martyn and Adrian Wood, the authors of the book I Can't Believe It's a Bigger and Better Updated Unofficial Simpsons Guide, thoroughly enjoyed the episode. They described the episode as "Another seasonal treat. Dial Z for Zombies is particularly impressive ('Die, you freak!' 'Dad, you killed the zombie Flanders!' 'He was a zombie?')." In 2006, IGN voted "Dial Z For Zombies" as the second best segment of the Treehouse of Horror episodes. "Clown Without Pity" was also rated sixth.

In the film 28 Days Later (2002), there is a scene where Sgt. Ferrell mentions that his favorite joke from The Simpsons was the line "Women and seamen (semen) don't mix", said by Smithers during the "King Homer" segment. The episode's reference to Night of the Living Dead was named the 16th greatest film reference in the history of the show by Total Films Nathan Ditum.

References

External links

The Simpsons (season 4) episodes
1992 American television episodes
Treehouse of Horror
Sentient toys in fiction
King Kong (franchise)
Television episodes about zombies
Halloween television episodes
Cultural depictions of George Washington
Cultural depictions of Albert Einstein
Cultural depictions of William Shakespeare

it:La paura fa novanta I-X#La paura fa novanta III